Forsbacka is a locality situated in Gävle Municipality, Gävleborg County, Sweden with 1,702 inhabitants in 2010.

Economy
Steel production company Ovako has a production site in Forsbacka with approximately 70 employees.

References 

Populated places in Gävle Municipality
Gästrikland